Jadin Wong (May 24, 1913 – March 30, 2010) was an American singer, dancer, actress, and comedian.

Early life 
Wong was born near Stockton, California, after which the family moved to San Francisco. She started singing in public at six years old. At age 16, she ran away to Hollywood to become a dancer. On the night she ran away, her mother secretly left some hard-earned cash for her to support herself, despite her father's objection.

Wong married three times. Her first husband was Li Sun from British Singapore, whom she divorced. She then married Edward Duryea Dowling. This second marriage was her longest marriage. More than a decade after Dowling's death, Wong married baseball champion Gil Chichester.

Celebrity manager 
Wong was a celebrity, diva, and grand dame who discovered John Lone. She performed ballet right into her 90s, where she was caught by an interviewing journalist doing splits and pirouettes as "morning exercise".  She studied with Balanchine and trained in classical ballet and jazz.

Professional life 
Wong performed in Hong Kong, Paris, Cuba, Germany and New York during her younger days in Charlie Low's Forbidden City.

Wong retired from performing on Broadway and cabaret comedy and went into theatrical agenting in the 1970s, creating the Jadin Wong Talent Management, where she cast for Bernardo Bertolucci and brought David Henry Hwang to fame with her theatrical connections. Clients included David Henry Hwang, John Lone, Joan Chen, Lou Diamond Phillips, Lucy Liu, Bai Ling, Vivian Wu, Linda Wang, Ming-na and  H. J. KAN in JPMorgan Chase annual report, Prime Time global UBS TV Commercial, etc. .

Awards 
She was honored with a Lifetime Achievement Award at Lincoln Center, New York in winter of 2002. Her thank you speech quoted in The New York Times was, "Age is just a number, and I have an unlisted number." Ben Stiller has been quoted in the press as calling Jadin Wong the "original Dragon Lady", before Ziyi Zhang.

WWII heroic commendations 
Wong traveled extensively to entertain American troops during World War II and nearly sacrificed her life for her country when she was nearly blown up by German enemy planes near the Black Forest.

She was recognized by President Ronald Reagan for her role in entertaining the nation's troops and by the U.S. House of Representatives for her cultural contributions to the nation. She was invited by President George Bush to the White House in 2004.

Social life 
Wong married into the blueblood family of New York theatre, the Chichesters, and the Jewish circle of playwrights and artists. Before Barbra Streisand became famous, Streisand was the opening act for Wong's show in New York. Streisand was subsequently replaced by Ben Stiller. Wong remains an honorary member of the Loews Theatre. She was featured in the New York Times in 2003 and 2004 as one of the most glamorous grand dames of New York.

Later life 
Wong was featured in Time, Newsweek and The New York Times. She resided in Manhattan and died at the age of 96.

References

External links
 
1966 article on Wong
2005 New York 1 documentary on Jadin Wong at 90
Obituary of Jadin Wong by Film Business Asia industry trade for International and Asian cinema industry
Obituary of Jadin Wong by Variety industry trade for Hollywood
Obituary of Jadin Wong by Playbill industry trade for Broadway
Jadin Wong ephemera, 1930-1996, held by the Billy Rose Theatre Division, New York Public Library for the Performing Arts
Jadin Wong and Edward Duryea Dowling papers, 1936-2000, held by the Billy Rose Theatre Division, New York Public Library for the Performing Arts
"Jadine Wong". Oakland Tribune, 20 Feb 1941, Page 25 . Retrieved on 17 May 2016.(photograph)

1913 births
2010 deaths
American female dancers
Dancers from California
American women singers
American musicians of Chinese descent
Musicians from Stockton, California
Singers from California
American dancers of Asian descent
American people of Chinese descent
Comedians from California
21st-century American women